Club Deportivo Guadalajara, often simply known as Guadalajara and their nickname Chivas, is a Mexican professional football club based in the Guadalajara metropolitan area, in Jalisco. Guadalajara is one of the ten founding members of the Mexican First Division (Liga MX) and along with Club América is one of only two teams that have never been relegated to the second-tier division.

Guadalajara have played their home matches at Estadio Akron in Zapopan since 2010, having previously played at Estadio Jalisco. Guadalajara is the only football club in Mexico that does not allow foreign players to play for their club. The team has constantly emphasized home-grown (cantera) players and has been the launching pad of many internationally successful players, including, Javier Hernández, Carlos Vela and Carlos Salcido. The team's three colors (red, white, and blue) symbolize "Fraternity, Union, and Sports". The founders of the team adopted the colors that linked them back to their home country, France. Chivas supporters use a flag identical to the French flag to support their team. The team mascot, as well as their nickname, is the goat or chiva. Chivas is one of Mexico's most successful teams and holds the Mexican league record for the longest winning streak at the beginning of a season, with 8 consecutive wins. Internationally, Guadalajara is the best Mexican side to compete in Copa Libertadores having reached the semifinals twice (2005 and 2006) and being runner-ups in the 2010 edition.

According to a 2016 study of preferred football clubs Guadalajara is the most popular team in Mexico, with 44.2% of supporters in the country. In 2020, Forbes estimated that the club was the most valuable of the league, ranking sixth overall in the Americas, worth approximately $311.5 million.

History

Early history

The team was founded by Edgar Everaert, who arrived in Mexico in 1906. Their kit was modeled on that of the founder's favourite team, the Belgian Club Brugge K.V., borrowing the vertical stripes and colour scheme of the Brugge strip in that era (Brugge has since changed their team colours). Some historians assert that the colours came from the French Tricolour because some of the club's first players were French. The first team comprised Mexican, Belgian, and French players. First named "Union" because of the camaraderie between the players of different nationalities, most of whom were employees of the Fábricas de Francia store, with founder Everaert as coach. A few Spanish and English also became members of the Unión Football Club.

On a tour of Europe, Everaert noticed that European teams named after their respective town or city seemed to generate more support from fans in their communities. So, in 1908, with the approval of Everaert and the players, Club de Futbol Union was renamed as Club Deportivo Guadalajara to engender a sense of loyalty within the city's population. In 1908, it was also decided that the team would only field Mexican-born players because of the growing sense of oppression Mexican nationals felt towards non-Mexican nationals. Following the aftermath of the Mexican Revolution, amateur football tournaments throughout the country flourished and Guadalajara was always involved. Between 1906 and 1943 (the amateur era of Mexican football and the Primera Fuerza), Guadalajara won 13 amateur titles, the first in 1908. Also during this period, the oldest rivalry in Mexican football began to form, between Guadalajara and America.

Professional Era, El Ya Merito (1943–1953)
In 1943 the Liga Mayor was founded after the merging of several regional leagues and the era of professional football began. Guadalajara struggled during the early years, with the exception of the 1948–49 season when they finished third. This same year Guadalajara was given the name "Chivas Locas" (Crazy Goats) during a game against Atlas. The name was initially considered an insult, but later adopted as the team's nickname due to the overwhelming popularity of the club. During the 1951–52 and 1954–55 seasons, the team finished as runner-up in the league, leading to the nickname "Ya Merito" ("Almost There!").

El Campeonísimo (1955–1970)
During the 1956 season, players such as Salvador "Chava" Reyes, Jaime "El Tubo" Gomez, Isidoro Lopez, and José Villegas were part of what is considered one of the finest teams in Mexican football history, El Campeonísimo. Guadalajara won its first championship during this season due to a last minute goal scored by Salvador Reyes. Led by coaches such as Donald Russ and Javier de la Torre in subsequent years, the team won seven league championships, two cups, three CONCACAF titles and seven Champion of Champions titles. It was the only team in Mexico's football history to win four league championships in a row, during the 1958–59, 1959–60, 1960–61, and 1961–62 seasons. El Campeonísimo became internationally recognized and, in 1964 played several matches in Europe against such teams as FC Barcelona, Werder Bremen, and Lille Olympique, resulting in two victories, four draws and four losses for the team.

The Dark Era (1971–1983)
During the 1970s and early 1980s, Guadalajara struggled. In the 1970–71 season, the team finished very close to the relegation zone. The best they could manage to reach was the play-offs twice, with a fifth-place finish in 1971–72 and a sixth-place finish in 1976–77. They began to be nicknamed  "Las Chivas Flacas" (The Lean Goats), due to their lean athletic performances. During the 1980–81 season, on 14 February 1981, the bus transporting the team to a match in Puebla was hit by a trailer, taking the life of midfielder Jose "Pepe" Martínez. During 1980–81 season, the team reached a third-place ranking. Eleven years after their near-relegation in 1971, Guadalajara managed to escape it yet again in the 1981–82 season by just one point.

Recovery (1983–1991)
Improvement came soon after the hiring of coach Alberto Guerra, who had been a player for Guadalajara during the mid '60s. During the 1982–83 season, Guadalajara finished seventh in the league and qualified for the playoffs, going on to eliminate Atlante F.C. in quarter-finals and Club América in Semifinals. The team reached the finals for the first time since the playoff format was introduced in the '70s, where they would go on to lose to Puebla F.C. in a penalty shootout. Guadalajara would once again reach the Finals in 1983–84, only to lose to America by an aggregate score of 5–4. The club would continue being competitive the rest of the '80s and early '90s., with their very best performance in the 1986–87 season, where they would finish 1st in the regular season and win the Championship against Cruz Azul in the final. Their best players during this time were Benjamín Galindo, Eduardo de la Torre, José Manuel de la Torre, Fernando Quirarte, and Javier Aguirre among others.

"La Promotora" Era (1992–2002)
By the end of the 1980s, Guadalajara began to experience financial troubles. Team directors decided to create a special financial sector that would be known as La Promotora Deportiva. The team would be "sold" for 10 years starting in 1992 to a petroleum executive named Salvador Martinez Garza, who would be in charge of the Promotora and of team operations. Before Guadalajara began its new era under the Promotora, the team began the 1990s in average form, reaching the Semifinals in 90–91, reaching the Quarterfinals in 91–92, and finishing in thirteenth place in 92–93.

The new directors decided to bring back Guadalajara's champion coach of the 1986–87 season Alberto Guerra and purchase many players that would become icons for Guadalajara in the early '90s: Missael Espinoza, Alberto "Guamerú" Garcia, and Alberto Coyote. The team also relied on young talent from the youth academy. Such talent included Paulo Cesar "Tilon" Chavez and Joel "Tiburon" Sanchez. At the beginning of the 93–94 season, the press and fans dubbed the new and improved team Las Superchivas. However, despite expectations, the team was eliminated early on in the playoffs. The 94–95 season would bring about more change for the team. The club directors sold all television rights of the team to Mexican giant Televisa, a move that was heavily criticized by fans because of Televisa's ownership of Club América. Guadalajara would end the 1993–1994 regular season as the leader in the league table, but was narrowly defeated by Club Necaxa in the Semifinals. The 96–97 season saw the exit of coach Alberto Guerra, being replaced by the Dutchman Leo Beenhakker. The team failed to make the playoffs that season.

By 1996, the Primera División de México season format would be changed to two short seasons per year. The first of the seasons, Invierno 1996, saw Guadalajara bring in another coach, Brazilian Ricardo Ferretti. During Ferretti's first season, the team managed to reach third place in the league table, but would be eliminated by Club Necaxa in the Quarterfinals. Guadalajara won its 10th championship under Ferretti in the Verano 1997 season against Toros Neza with the aggregate score of 7–2. Guadalajara would once again reach the Finals in the Invierno 1998 season, only to once again lose to Necaxa.

New Ownership Era (2002–2011)
After its tenth year in charge of Guadalajara, La Promotora was still in debt and finally put up for sale. On 31 October 2002, the team was acquired by a Guadalajara native and self-made entrepreneur, Jorge Vergara. Vergara was the founder of a multi level marketing named Grupo Omnilife. Vergara hired directors that would be in charge of handling business affairs. He also removed all sponsorship from Guadalajara's jersey; the jersey has since had limited sponsorship.

In order to establish funding for the team, Vergara sought to market the Las Chivas name and capitalize on it, placing the name on anything from its own magazine to toothbrushes and its own brand of cola.

For the Clausura 2003 season, Guadalajara hired Eduardo de la Torre, who had played for the team in the 1980s. The Apertura 2003 season would see poor results in the first half of the tournament, putting an end to de la Torre's tenure as coach. Coaching responsibilities would be temporarily assumed by Dutchman Hans Westerhof and the team would qualify for a wild card showdown against Club Deportivo Toluca, only to be subsequently eliminated.

In February 2004, it was announced that the club would construct a new stadium.

In the Apertura 2004, Guadalajara would display an offensive style of football and managed to place third in the league standings, qualifying for the playoffs. Players such as goalkeeper Oswaldo Sánchez, Ramon Morales, Omar Bravo, and newly acquired Adolfo Bautista, became instant fan favorites. They defeated Atlante F.C. in the quarterfinals and Toluca in the semifinals, but would lose in the Finals against UNAM in a penalty shootout. Nevertheless, the team had shown, since Vergara's arrival, that it was highly competitive, including in the 2005 Copa Libertadores, where it defeated favorites Boca Juniors 4–0 aggregate to reach the semifinals.
Under coach José Manuel de la Torre, whom was a player for Guadalajara in the 1980s, the team won its 11th championship. In the Apertura 2006 season, Las Chivas placed eighth in the league table and qualified for the playoffs by defeating Veracruz 2–1 in Veracruz and 4–0 in the Estadio Jalisco in a wild card series. Guadalajara advanced to the quarterfinals where they defeated Cruz Azul 2–0 in the first leg and tied 2–2 in the second leg (4–2 aggregate), moving on to the semi-finals against rivals Club América.

The club advanced to the final of the Primera División against Toluca. The first match was played at Estadio Jalisco, in which Toluca and Las Chivas tied 1–1 with goals from Omar Bravo for Las Chivas and Bruno Marioni for Toluca. On 10 December 2006, Las Chivas played at Toluca's home stadium Estadio Nemesio Díez and won 2–1 (3–2 aggregate), thus becoming the Mexican League champions by holding 11 titles, the most titles of any team in the league at the time. The first goal was scored by Francisco Javier Rodriguez, and the second was by Adolfo Bautista.

Bautista dedicated his goal and his team's victory to his mother, who had died shortly before. This championship was goalkeeper Oswaldo Sánchez's first in his career. After the Apertura 2006 championship the team had gone through a series of changes with the departures of Oswaldo Sánchez, Adolfo Bautista, and Omar Bravo who left to play in Spain. José Manuel de la Torre was fired in the Apertura 2007 tournament and replaced by Efrain Flores. After Flores's stint at the club Omar Arellano Nuño was appointed, but he only coached one league game and two Copa Libertadores matches. Arellano was replaced by Francisco Ramirez who had an unsuccessful period as coach by having the lowest percentage of effectiveness of all the coaches hired in the last seven years. Ramirez was fired and replaced by Raul Arias, who also had a terrible run at the club. On 4 November 2009, Raul Arias was fired and replaced by José Luis Real. Real lead the team to an explosive start of the 2010 Bicentenario tournament, winning the first 8 games in a row. Nevertheless, their winning streak was broken against the low table team, Chiapas F.C., losing by a score of 4–0. Under José Luis Real, Chivas saw many young and promising players blossoming even more rapidly than expected, including Javier Hernández, who was signed by English club Manchester United on 8 April; Hernandez additionally finished the tournament as joint-top scorer with 10 goals and named best forward. Chivas qualified to the championship stage after a second place general table finish but lost to Monarcas Morelia in the first round with an aggregate score of 5–2.

On 30 July, Chivas played their inaugural match in their newly constructed stadium against Manchester United, as part of a deal where Javier Hernández was headed to the English club. Hernández played for Guadalajara in the first half, scoring within the first 8 minutes and switched sides in the second, unable to prevent a 3–2 defeat for Manchester United.

In August, Chivas played that year's Copa Libertadores finals against Brazilian club Sport Club Internacional but lost following an aggregate score of 5–3, becoming the second Mexican club to reach the tournament's final.

The New Dark Era (2011–2015)
Starting with the release of Jose Luis Real as coach in October 2011, Chivas struggled to maintain form finding themselves with 9 coaches being hired and released in the past 3 years. The club was in danger of being relegated to the second division for the first time in their history. In February 2012, Johan Cruyff was hired as the team's advisor. Nine months later the club sacked him, mainly due to the fact that the team was not improving. On 22 November 2013 Guadalajara placed multiple important players on the transfer list: Marco Fabián, Miguel Ponce, and veterans Luis Michel and Héctor Reynoso. On 25 November 2013, it was confirmed that Jose Luis Real would return to C.D. Guadalajara as head coach. Real showed improvement in the squad but was soon released after the team lost 4–0 at home to rivals Club América. On 2 April 2014, veteran manager Ricardo La Volpe was appointed as head coach. He was immediately released on 30 April 2014 supposedly due to having inappropriate conduct with a female staff member who later took legal action against him. On 12 May 2014, Carlos Bustos was appointed as head coach. On 2 October 2014, Bustos resigned after a 3–1 loss to Club Toluca. He left the team with two wins, four draws, and four losses. On 7 October 2014, former Mexico national team manager José Manuel de la Torre was appointed as head coach. The club started the 2015 season with a 2–1 loss against Chiapas, and this result caused them to become tied in the last position of the Liga MX relegation table with Puebla. The very next week the club showed better character after a 2–1 win at home against Pumas UNAM in front of a very supportive, and completely sold-out crowd of fans. By game 12 of the 2015 Clausura season, Guadalajara managed to earn 21 points after winning crucial matches against teams such as Monterrey and relegation rivals Puebla. José Manuel de la Torre's strategic 4–2–3–1 formation proved effect during matches despite the fans' constant requests to use two strikers in the starting line-up. In game 13 of the season, Guadalajara defeated Club León in the Estadio Omnilife's 100th official match and went up to 1st place with 24 points. José Manuel de la Torre's effectiveness rose to 62.1%, the highest rate in the Clausura 2015 season. The club finished the 2015 Clausura in fifth place with the third best defense of the season, thus, qualifying to the playoffs for the first time since 2012. The team started the 2015 Apertura season with 4 points in 6 games and a squad plagued with injuries. On 14 September 2015, the club announced they had released De la Torre.

The Second Resurrection (2015–present)
On 18 September 2015, the club officially presented Matías Almeyda as new manager, proclaiming he wanted to "awaken the giant." Almeyda immediately made his style of attacking football known by consecutively winning his first four matches, including the match against rivals Club América on 26 September 2015 by a score of 2–1 at the Estadio Azteca. On 4 November, Guadalajara won its third Copa MX after defeating Club León by a score of 1–0 via a 75th-minute header scored by defender Oswaldo Alanís. On 8 May, the club qualified for the Clausura 2016 Liguilla, earning 28 points and finishing 5th. After seasons of struggles and disappointing results, the club earned ninth place in the official relegation table for the 2016–2017 season due to their good performances throughout the 2015–2016 season, thus, starting their end of relegation troubles and surpassing clubs such as Cruz Azul and Club Tijuana.

On 21 May 2016, club owner Jorge Vergara announced in an official press conference that the club was not renewing contract with Mexican television giants Televisa, thus, ending a 22-year run with the broadcasting company. Vergara then announced the establishment of Chivas TV, the club's own channel for live games, interviews, and more. Chivas TV would have a rough start with many complaints from customers about a difficulty watching the live games, but the service would get better as the season progressed and allies such as Cinepolis Klic, Claro Video, and TDN joined the project and also broadcast the live games.

On 10 July 2016, Chivas played their first ever Supercopa MX and won the title by defeating Veracruz 2–0, with goals from Orbelin Pineda and Omar Bravo, and qualifying to the Copa Libertadores for the first time since 2012, however, they would ultimately not participate due to the Copa Libertadores had a new format which Mexican teams couldn't adapt to, thus withdrawing from the competition.

On 19 April 2017, Chivas won their fourth Copa MX title, defeating Monarcas Morelia in a penalty shoot-out by a score of 3–1 after a goalless draw, with Guadalajara goalkeeper Miguel Jiménez stopping three consecutive penalties during the series. The following month, they played Atlas, Toluca and in the Clausura championship final was played against Tigres UANL, with Guadalajara winning their twelfth league title following an aggregate victory of 4–3 after two legs. With the capture of the Liga MX title, Chivas became the first team in Mexican history to win a Double in a single season on two different occasions and their first since the since the 1969–70 season.

On 25 April 2018, Guadalajara won the CONCACAF Champions League final against Major League Soccer side Toronto FC, defeating them 4–2 via penalty shoot-out, with all four players scoring, after a 3–3 aggregate draw. As a result of winning the title, Guadalajara qualified for the 2018 FIFA Club World Cup. On 11 June 2018, however, he left, citing differences with an executive. The following day, José Cardozo was appointed manager.

In December, at the FIFA Club World Cup, they concluded their first participation in the tournament with a sixth place finish after losing in a penalty shoot-out against Tunisian club Esperance Sportive de Tunis. In March 2019, Cardozo was let go following a losing streak of 4 matches and on 10 April, Tomás Boy was named as his successor.

On 15 November 2019, Grupo Omnilife and club owner Jorge Vergara died at the age of 64 of cardiac arrest. His son, Amaury Vergara, inherited the presidency of the club.

On 26 November, Amaury Vergara officially presented Ricardo Peláez as the club's new sporting director and Luis Fernando Tena as the new manager.

Tena was let go on 9 August after going the first three matches of the Guardianes 2020 tournament scoreless, losing twice. Four days later, Victor Manuel Vucetich was appointed as the new manager. Following a seventh place general table finish, they made it to the Guardianes 2020 semi-finals, losing 2–1 to eventual league winners Club León.

Colors and badge

Once the team was renamed in 1908 as Club Guadalajara, they used initials, C.G., in the centre of the jersey. After a few years of the team's existence, the first proper crest was designed, still using the team's initials. They were eventually placed around a circle. This design would be used in the team's limited edition Centennial jerseys in 2006.

Guadalajara's current crest was designed in 1923 and uses as its base, the crest of the city of Guadalajara, Jalisco. The crest was then complemented with a blue circle and the words Club Deportivo Guadalajara, five red stripes and six white stripes, eventual colours that were adopted by the team, and twelve stars representing each championship the team has won. The actual crest design is credited to brothers Everardo and Jose Espinosa, Angel Bolumar, and Antonio Villalvazo, all of whom were players or directors of the team during that time.

Kit provider:Puma (Apertura 2016–   )
Sponsors: Caliente, Tecate, Granvita, Telcel, Akron, Coca-Cola, Sello Rojo
Source:

Past kits

|

|

|

|

|

|

|

|

|

|

|

|

|

|

JVC is a brand of property of the team's president, Jorge Vergara (JVC are the initials of his father's name, Jorge Vergara Cabrera), although these are manufactured by Grendene de México S.A. de C.V.

Stadium

From the 1930s to 1960, Guadalajara played in a small stadium known as "Parque Oblatos". Guadalajara next shared the Estadio Jalisco with their town rivals Atlas. Estadio Jalisco was inaugurated on 31 January 1960. It was host for eight games in the 1970 FIFA World Cup, six group-stage matches, and one each in the quarterfinals and semifinals. The stadium was host for nine games in the 1986 FIFA World Cup, six group-stage matches, one round-of-16 match, one quarterfinal, and one semifinal. Chivas played in the Jalisco Stadium from 1960 to 2010. Due to the aging structure of the stadium and the desire of Chivas to have their own stadium to call home, owner Jorge Vergara decided to construct a stadium (Jalisco Stadium was always shared with various teams from the city such as Atlas, Club Universidad de Guadalajara, and Club Oro, among others). Chivas administration used an investment of 130 million dollars to build a new home.

In 2010, Las Chivas's new home field was completed. Estadio Omnilife (then named after the nutrition company owned by Vergara) was designed to look like a volcano with a cloud on top. The idea of the design is to integrate the stadium with nature because of its proximity to a forest area. It is also used for conventions and as a Business JVC Center. Construction of the stadium began in May 2007 and concluded in July 2010. The stadium seats are red, except for the loge seats that are white. It has a large main entrance and 18 exits. Total seating capacity is 49,850, which includes 330 suites with capacities of nine to 13 guests. An underground parking lot is available for suite renters, which holds up to 850 cars, and parking outside the stadium has capacity for 8,000 cars. The new stadium also has a store, a museum, and various food and beverage concessions. The stadium's opening date was 30 July 2010. The inaugural match was a friendly between Chivas and Manchester United that Chivas won 3–2, with the first goal scored by Javier "Chicharito" Hernandez. In March 2016, the stadium was renamed Estadio Chivas.

Rivalries

El Súper Clásico 

Chivas has developed two important rivalries over the years. Perhaps its most intense rivalry is with Mexico City-based Club América. Their meetings, which have become known as El Súper Clásico, are played at least twice a year and signal a national derby. Both are the most successful and most popular teams in Mexico. The first confrontation between them ended with a victory for Guadalajara with a score of 3–0.The rivalry began to flourish after the second match when Club América defeated Guadalajara with a score of 7–2. Although the huge defeat sparked embarrassment within Chivas, it was almost two decades before the rivalry became The Clásico. One of the very reasons why these two teams are archrivals is because in 1983 and 1986 they brawled with each other, raising excitement among the fans. Thus, every time they play it is considered a match that everyone will remember. To this day, El Clásico de Clásicos continues to raise huge excitement in the whole country as well as in other parts of the world where there are fans of either team. The intensity of the game is lived so passionately that every time these two teams play a game, regardless of what position they are in on the charts or what level they show throughout the league, it is always considered the most important game of the season. El Súper Clásico was ranked 12th on FourFourTwo's 50 biggest derbies list.

El Clásico Tapatío

The Clásico Tapatío, as it is known, is the oldest derby in Mexican football since its inception in 1916, being a game that is lived with great passion on the part of supporters of both Chivas and Club Atlas. In the early stages of the rivalry Guadalajara supporters started to dub players of Atlas by calling them "Margaritas". In reaction to the name, a group of Atlas supporters reacted by claiming that their rivals ran like "Chivas Locas" (Crazy Goats) and to the Chivas players it was considered an insult. Over time the meaning of "Chivas" changed due to the popularity of the club and it became a term of endearment upon the Chivas fans. They used to share Estadio Jalisco, which caused controversies with the fans until, in 2010 Chivas moved to the Estadio Chivas.

Personnel

Management

Sources:

Coaching staff

Players

First-team squad

Out on loan

Reserve teams

Tapatío
Reserve team that plays in the Liga de Expansión MX in the second level of the Mexican league system.

Álamos
Reserve team that plays in the Liga TDP in the third level of the Mexican league system.

Player records
All players are Mexican unless otherwise noted.

Top scorers

Primera División

All-time records
Players in bold are still active with the team.

Retired numbers 

 8 –  Salvador Reyes (forward, 1953–1967, 2008) – retired in January 2013.
 22 –  José Martínez González (midfielder, 1970–81) (posthumous)

Managerial history

Honours

 

 Doubles
Liga MX and Concacaf (1): 1961-62
Liga MX and Copa MX (2): 1969-70, 2017

References

External links

 

 
Football clubs in Guadalajara, Jalisco
Association football clubs established in 1906
Multi-sport clubs in Mexico
Liga MX teams
1906 establishments in Mexico
Unrelegated association football clubs
Primera Fuerza teams
Mexican nationalism
G